The Collaborative Computational Project Number 4 in protein crystallography (CCP4) was set up in 1979 in the United Kingdom to support collaboration between researchers working in software development and assemble a comprehensive collection of software for structural biology. The CCP4 core team is located at the Research Complex at Harwell (RCaH) at Rutherford Appleton Laboratory (RAL) in Didcot, near Oxford, UK.

CCP4 was originally supported by the UK Science and Engineering Research Council (SERC), and is now supported by the Biotechnology and Biological Sciences Research Council (BBSRC). The project is coordinated at CCLRC Daresbury Laboratory. The results of this effort gave rise to the CCP4 program suite, which is now distributed to academic and commercial users worldwide.

Projects
CCP4i – CCP4 Graphical User Interface
CCP4MG – CCP4 Molecular Graphics Project
Coot – Graphical Model Building
HAPPy – automated experimental phasing
MrBUMP – automated Molecular Replacement
PISA – Protein Interfaces, Surfaces and Assemblies
MOSFLM GUI – building a modern interface to MOSFLM

See also 
 CCP4 (file format)

External links 
 
 CCP4 Documentation wiki — concentrates only on CCP4
 CCP4 Community wiki — general X-ray crystallography topics related to CCP4

References 

Crystallography
Medical Research Council (United Kingdom)
Science and technology in Oxfordshire
Vale of White Horse